"Dead End Countdown" is the debut single by Canadian band The New Cities from their debut album, Lost in City Lights. It peaked at #16 on the Canadian Hot 100 in July 2009 and a month later, the single was certified gold by the CRIA with over 20,000 digital downloads.

The song won the SOCAN "POP/ROCK music award" and the music video , directed by Jodeb, has been nominated at the 2009 MuchMusic Video Awards for "Post-Production of the Year".

References

2009 debut singles
2009 songs
Songs written by Greig Nori